Shea Ili (born 6 October 1992) is a New Zealand professional basketball player for the Sandringham Sabres of the NBL1 South. He is also contracted with Melbourne United of the National Basketball League (NBL). Ili was raised in Māngere Bridge, playing his basketball at Onehunga High School and appearing for Counties Manukau in rep teams before appearing in the New Zealand NBL with the Auckland Pirates in 2012. In 2014, he joined the New Zealand Breakers as a development player. That season, he was a member of the Breakers' championship-winning team. In 2016, he was elevated to the Breakers' full-time roster, and in February 2018, he was named the NBL Most Improved Player for the 2017–18 season.

In 2015, Ili helped the Southland Sharks win the New Zealand NBL championship before joining the Wellington Saints in 2016 and earning Most Outstanding Kiwi Guard honours. He also garnered his second straight championship. He re-joined the Saints in 2017, and behind a Finals MVP performance, guided the Saints to another championship to garner a personal three-peat. In 2018, he won the New Zealand NBL Most Valuable Player Award and guided the Saints to a fourth straight grand final appearance.

In 2019, Ili made the switch from the Breakers to Melbourne United. With the Saints that same year, he won his fifth New Zealand NBL championship. In 2021, he won his second Australian NBL championship as a member of Melbourne United.

Early life and career
Ili was born in Auckland and raised in the suburb of Māngere Bridge. He attended Onehunga High School, where he was not only a member of the basketball team, but was also a talented rugby player. As a halfback, he progressed to the Auckland under-21 team, but his rugby ambitions were put to aside because of his basketball commitments.

As a youth, Ili competed for Counties Manukau Basketball Association rep teams. In 2011, he was named in the U21 Men's National Championship Tournament Team; in 2013, he was named in the U23 Men's National Championship Tournament Team; and in 2014, he helped Counties Manukau win the U23 Men's National Championship title while being named in the Tournament Team.

Professional career

Early years in the NZNBL (2012–2014)
Ili made his debut in the New Zealand National Basketball League (NZNBL) as a 19-year-old with the Auckland Pirates in 2012. He appeared in four games for the Pirates that year and was a member of their championship-winning squad. The Pirates folded following the 2012 season, which resulted in Ili joining the Super City Rangers for the 2013 season. He was one of the Rangers' standouts in 2013 despite them just winning just two games. He appeared in 15 games for the Rangers that year, averaging 10.9 points, 3.7 rebounds, 2.1 assists and 1.3 steals per game.

In December 2013, Ili made the move down south as he signed with the Southland Sharks for the 2014 season. The lure of playing alongside experienced guards Luke Martin and Kevin Braswell at the Sharks was enough for Ili to put pen to paper. It took some time for Ili to adjust to the quieter lifestyle of Invercargill, and he said his main focus during his time in the south was to work hard and get better. However, he appeared in just 10 games for the Sharks in 2014 after he was suspended indefinitely by the team in late May following a fight outside a bar in New Plymouth that he and teammates Reuben Te Rangi and Leon Henry were involved in. The trio were stood down by the team for the second half of the season, and in June, all three pleaded guilty to attacking bar staff. Ili pleaded guilty to two charges: common assault and assault with intent to injure. In August, Henry and Ili agreed to carry out clinics in Taranaki to assist young basketballers, to help make good the damage they caused to the community. Neither wanted a discharge without conviction. Ili received a four-month sentence of community detention and was ordered to pay reparation of $750 to one victim and $500 to the other.

New Zealand Breakers and continued uprise in the NZNBL (2014–2019)

First season with the Breakers (2014–15)
Despite a tumultuous three months for Ili, on 15 August 2014, he was announced as a development player signing by the New Zealand Breakers for the 2014–15 NBL season. A former Breakers Academy player in 2011, Ili was highly rated by the Breakers for his athleticism, work rate and attitude. Three months later, on 24 November 2014, Ili re-signed with the Southland Sharks for the 2015 season. Keen to make amends, Ili welcomed a return to Southland. Southland Sharks general manager Jill Bolger acknowledged that the off-field incident was a blow to the franchise but was still keen to have Ili back in 2015.

Ili was an active member of the Breakers roster for eight games during the 2014–15 season and made five appearances. On 8 March 2015, he became a championship-winning player with the Breakers after they defeated the Cairns Taipans in Game 2 of the NBL Grand Final series, thus sweeping the best-of-three series.

Second season with the Sharks (2015)
With the Southland Sharks in 2015, Ili began to demonstrate his athletic prowess. His energy and growing skill set complemented the talents of teammates Todd Blanchfield, Kevin Braswell and Tai Wesley. Sharks coach Paul Henare made it clear that Ili starting to stamp his mark on the New Zealand competition was no fluke considering his work ethic, which included his time working with the Breakers during the 2014–15 Australian NBL season. On 19 June 2015, Ili scored a career-high 24 points off the bench in a 101–91 win over the Manawatu Jets. The Sharks dominated the league in 2015, finishing the regular season on a 14-game win streak to claim their first minor premiership with a 15–3 record. The Sharks won through to the NZNBL Grand Final, where they defeated the Wellington Saints 72–68 to win their second championship in three years. Ili appeared in all 20 games for the Sharks in 2015, averaging 9.4 points, 4.3 rebounds and 3.6 assists per game.

Second season with the Breakers (2015–16)
Heading into the 2015–16 NBL season, the Breakers were without star guard Corey Webster, who was in the United States chasing an NBA contract. As a result, Ili, a designated development player, stepped into the backcourt rotation where hopes were high the 22-year-old could transform his aggression and athleticism into something effective at NBL level. Ili was given minutes on a regular basis for the Breakers towards the end of the season, including during the playoffs. In 20 games for the Breakers in 2015–16, he averaged 1.7 points and 1.3 rebounds per game.

First season with the Saints (2016)
On 25 February 2016, Ili signed with the Wellington Saints for the 2016 season, joining Tai Wesley in a move up north. On 22 May 2016, Ili scored a career-high 28 points in the Saints' 78–75 loss to the Southland Sharks. Six days later, Ili was the best performer for the Saints in their 96–83 win over the Nelson Giants, scoring a game-high 25 points in another promising showing. The Saints finished the regular season in second place with a 13–5 record, and won through to the NZNBL Grand Final, where they defeated the Super City Rangers 94–82. Ili appeared in 19 games for the Saints in 2016, averaging career highs in points (14.8) and assists (5.5), to go with 3.4 rebounds and 1.1 steals. He missed one game during the season to attend his own wedding. He was honoured at the season's end with the John Macdonald Trophy for being named the Most Outstanding Kiwi Guard.

Third season with the Breakers (2016–17)
On 27 April 2016, Ili signed a full-time contract with the Breakers. However, he was an early casualty as the Breakers launched their pre-season due to a stress fracture in his back that ruled him out for at least six weeks. Ili picked up the injury while playing for the Saints, though played a full part in the Tall Blacks' Olympic qualifying programme. Only after commencing preparations for the new Australian NBL season was the full extent of the problem discovered. The Breakers wasted no time bringing in a short-term replacement for Ili, with Australian Isaih Tueta joining the squad in mid-September ahead of the 2016–17 NBL season. After spending three months on the sidelines, Ili was reactivated in late November and made his debut as a fully contracted roster player in Cairns against the Taipans. After making the grand final in 2016, the Breakers missed the playoffs in 2017 with a 14–14 record. Ili appeared in 17 games for the Breakers in 2016–17, averaging 4.4 points, 1.9 rebounds and 1.5 assists per game.

Second season with the Saints (2017)
Ili returned to the Saints in 2017 for another run at a title. He was a dominant force in his second season as a Saint, highlighted by his pass-first nature to his free-scoring teammates. On 6 April 2017, Ili didn't put a shot up from the field in his side's 100–87 win over the Taranaki Mountainairs, scoring one point from a free-throw in 19 minutes, but he managed 10 assists and turned the ball over just once. With characteristic humbleness, Ili said after the game that his job was made a lot easier by the talented players around him, such as his backcourt starting partner Corey Webster. Throughout April, Ili continued his maturation into the league's best local point guard. On 17 April, he had 22 points and 15 assists in a 102–79 win over the Canterbury Rams. Eight days later, he had 27 points, 10 assists and six steals in a 110–84 win over the Nelson Giants. On 19 May, he scored a career-high 30 points in a 109–94 win over the Southland Sharks. He guided the Saints to a perfect 18–0 regular season and helped them earn another grand final appearance. In the NZNBL championship decider on 17 June, Ili set a new career high with 31 points in the Saints' 108–75 rout of the Sharks. The win saw the Saints collect their 10th NBL Championship, with Ili winning his third straight NZNBL title. The Saints became the first team to complete an unbeaten season, capping off a perfect 20–0 campaign with their grand final win over Southland. Ili's 31-point effort earned him Finals MVP honours. He also picked up All-Star Five honours in the end-of-season awards. For the season, he averaged career highs with 16.1 points, 6.5 assists and 2.3 steals, to go with 4.2 rebounds while appearing in all 20 games.

Fourth season with the Breakers (2017–18)
Early on in the 2017–18 season, Ili built a reputation as a potential breakout star, with many tipping him to earn most improved honours. His early season form off the bench resulted in a career-high 23 points on 26 October 2017 in a 101–96 win over the Brisbane Bullets. His next best performance came on 4 February 2018, scoring 17 points in an 88–84 finals-clinching win over the Illawarra Hawks. The Breakers finished the regular season in fourth place with a 15–13 record. On the eve of the Breakers' finals campaign, Ili was named the NBL Most Improved Player for the 2017–18 season. He averaged 9.2 points, 3.1 assists and 2.9 rebounds in 21.5 minutes per game in 2017–18, well up from the 4.4 points, 1.4 assists and 1.9 rebounds he accumulated in 18.3 minutes per game in 2016–17. In Game 1 of the Breakers' semi-finals series against the first-seeded Melbourne United, Ili scored 16 points in an 88–77 loss. The Breakers went on to lose the series 2–0, as they bowed out of the finals with an 88–86 loss to Melbourne in Game 2. Ili appeared in all 30 games for the Breakers in 2017–18, averaging 9.2 points, 3.0 assists and 2.9 rebounds per game.

Third season with the Saints (2018)
In March 2018, Ili re-joined the Saints for the 2018 season. In the Saints' season opener on 27 April 2018, Ili recorded game highs of 32 points and 10 assists in a 113–108 loss to the Southland Sharks. The Saints had not lost since 22 May 2016 – against the Sharks in Invercargill – and according to coach Kevin Braswell, it was poor defensive effort which ended their winning streak. On 25 May, he recorded 31 points, nine assists and six rebounds in a 109–101 win over the Manawatu Jets. Two days later, he scored 27 points in an 80–77 win over the Hawke's Bay Hawks. He subsequently earned Player of the Week honours for Round 5. On 8 June, he was invited to attend an NBA mini-camp run by the Dallas Mavericks on 18–19 June. Two days later, he recorded 28 points and seven assists in an 86–77 win over the Hawks. He subsequently earned Player of the Week honours for Round 7. The Saints finished the regular season as minor premiers with a league-best 15–3 record. In their semi-final against the Hawks, Ili recorded 18 points, nine assists, six rebounds in a 99–73 win. In the final a day later, the Saints fell short of their three-peat quest with a 98–96 loss to the Sharks, despite Ili's game-high 27 points. In 19 games, he averaged a career-high 22.2 points to go with 4.4 rebounds, 6.2 assists and 1.8 steals per game.

Fifth season with the Breakers (2018–19)
On 22 March 2018, Ili re-signed with the Breakers on a two-year deal. While he struggled offensively during the 2018–19 season, Ili's defence was a highlight, proving himself to be one of the best stoppers in the league. On 30 December 2018, he scored a season-high 19 points in a 109–98 loss to the Adelaide 36ers. On 3 February 2019, he scored 18 points in a 111–102 overtime loss to Melbourne United. The Breakers finished the season in sixth place with a 12–16 record. In 27 games, Ili averaged 7.9 points, 2.5 rebounds and 2.8 assists per game.

On 19 June 2019, Ili requested a release from the final year of his contract with the Breakers in order to pursue more minutes at another NBL club. Ili's departure was closely associated with the Breakers' signing of 18-year-old American high school sensation R. J. Hampton under the league's Next Stars programme, with Hampton, a point guard, reportedly guaranteed significant minutes as part of his contract.

Fourth season with the Saints (2019)
In April 2019, Ili re-joined the Saints for the 2019 season. He quickly cemented himself as an MVP favourite, and led the Saints to the minor premiership with an undefeated 18–0 regular season. In the Saints' semi-final against the Southland Sharks, Ili scored a game-high 32 points in a 95–89 win. In the final, Ili had nine points, eight assists and five rebounds in a 78–68 victory over the Hawke's Bay Hawks to help the Saints complete a 20–0 season and win the championship. For the season, Ili was named Most Outstanding Kiwi Guard and All-Star Five.

Melbourne United (2019–present)
On 20 June 2019, Ili signed a two-year deal with Melbourne United. Despite a 0–3 start for Melbourne to begin the 2019–20 season, Ili helped the team recover to a 4–4 record after round 6. A minor calf injury to Ili in round 8 saw him miss two round 9 games. Ili was moved into the starting line-up during United's 2–1 semi-final series loss to the Sydney Kings. In 29 games, he averaged 6.4 points, 2.1 rebounds and 2.2 assists per game.

Ili was ruled out for the majority of February 2021 with a left ankle injury. He helped United win the championship for the 2020–21 season and shot a career-high 43.2% from 3-point range. Following the season, he had a three-game stint with the Geelong Supercats of the NBL1 South.

On 27 June 2021, Ili re-signed with United on a two-year deal. In 2021–22, he helped United secure a second straight minor premiership and was a finalist for best defender. He was named NBL Best Sixth Man after averaging a career high in assists and steals off the bench, while shooting the ball at above 41% from 3-point range for the second consecutive year. United lost 2–1 in the semi-finals to the Tasmania JackJumpers despite Ili's team-high 18 points in game three. Following the season, he joined the Sandringham Sabres of the NBL1 South and won league MVP and Defensive Player of the Year.

On 26 July 2022, Ili signed a two-year contract extension with United. During the pre-season, he suffered a concussion which lingered until December. He suffered another concussion in January 2023. He is set to re-join the Sabres for the 2023 NBL1 South season.

National team career
In June 2015, Ili was named in a 22-man Tall Blacks squad to trial and be considered for selection for the Oceania Series against Australia in August. A month later, he was named in the final squad ahead of the team's European tour, going on to play in Game 2 of New Zealand's Oceania Series against Australia.

In July 2016, Ili competed for New Zealand at the FIBA World Olympic Qualifying Tournament in Manila. Over the three games they played, Ili averaged 3.7 points, 3.7 rebounds and 3.0 assists per game. Unbeknownst to Ili, he picked up a stress fracture in his back during the 2016 New Zealand NBL season, and played through it on the Tall Blacks' tour through China, Europe and the Philippines. It was only while preparing for his first season as a full roster player with the New Zealand Breakers that he discovered the seriousness of his tight back.

On 12 July 2017, Ili was invited to a six-day Tall Blacks camp in Auckland, ahead of a final 12-man roster being named to travel to the FIBA Asia Cup in Lebanon, via preparation matches in China. Ili went on to average a team-high 15.5 points, 5.8 assists and 2.2 rebounds for the Tall Blacks during the FIBA Asia Cup, and was subsequently named to the tournament's All-Star Five. The Tall Blacks finished the tournament in fourth place after losing to South Korea in the bronze medal game; Ili missed the game after splitting the webbing on his hand during the semi-final defeat to Australia.

In November 2017 and February 2018, Ili represented the Tall Blacks during the 2019 FIBA Basketball World Cup qualifiers. On 16 March 2018, he was named in the Tall Blacks squad for the Commonwealth Games. He helped the Tall Blacks win bronze at the Commonwealth Games. In May 2018, he won both the outstanding New Zealand men's player and the 2017 MVP award at Basketball New Zealand's annual awards night. In August 2018, he re-joined the Tall Blacks for two more qualifiers in September.

Personal life
Ili is of Samoan descent. His father and members of his mother's family hail from Samoa. His older brother, Stacey, is a professional rugby union player.

In March 2016, Ili married Morgan Roberts, a former Oregon Tech University basketball scholarship holder. The couple have two children.

References

External links
NBL profile
NZNBL stats (2012–18)
"Tall Blacks standout Shea Ili eyes breakthrough season in Australian NBL" at stuff.co.nz
"Shea Ili keeps on building to emerge as a major player in Breakers' title quest" at stuff.co.nz
"Globetrotting Shea Ili comes back to earth for Tall Blacks' double-duty assignment" at stuff.co.nz
"Defence First: The Shea Ili Impact" at nbl.com.au

1992 births
Living people
Auckland Pirates players
Basketball players at the 2018 Commonwealth Games
Basketball players from Auckland
Commonwealth Games bronze medallists for New Zealand
Commonwealth Games medallists in basketball
Melbourne United players
New Zealand Breakers players
New Zealand expatriate basketball people in Australia
New Zealand men's basketball players
People educated at Onehunga High School
Point guards
Southland Sharks players
Super City Rangers players
Wellington Saints players
2019 FIBA Basketball World Cup players
Medallists at the 2018 Commonwealth Games